Sven Lodziewski   (born 17 March 1965 in Leipzig, Saxony) is a former freestyle swimmer from East Germany, who competed for his native country at the 1988 Summer Olympics.

There he won the silver medal in the 4×200 metres freestyle, alongside Uwe Dassler, Thomas Flemming, and Steffen Zesner. He swam for SC Dynamo Berlin.

References

 databaseOlympics.com
 

1965 births
Living people
German male swimmers
East German male swimmers
Olympic swimmers of East Germany
Swimmers at the 1988 Summer Olympics
Olympic silver medalists for East Germany
Swimmers from Leipzig
German male freestyle swimmers
World Aquatics Championships medalists in swimming
European Aquatics Championships medalists in swimming
Medalists at the 1988 Summer Olympics
Olympic silver medalists in swimming
Sportspeople from Leipzig